East Sooke is an unincorporated community south and east of Sooke, British Columbia, Canada. It consists of over 500 houses (and one volunteer fire department) along with the headquarters of the Royal Canadian Marine Search and Rescue (RCMSAR) organization on the south side of the Sooke Basin.

East Sooke does not have a town council. Instead it is governed by a regional director who is also responsible for other unincorporated areas in the Capital Regional District (the regional district of Greater Victoria).

East Sooke's general character is rural, although it is a bedroom community of Victoria, British Columbia. Its close proximity to Victoria, its character as a bedroom community, and its large tracts of undeveloped land have made it an attractive location for recreation and retirement developments. Political scuffles over the development of the community have led to two large sections of East Sooke splitting off and joining Sooke. Those in Sooke generally consider this to be a positive acquisition, whereas those in East Sooke consider it a non-hostile occupation. Due to these recent incursions into East Sooke territory, the expectation is that East Sooke will ultimately be swallowed by a neighboring community, be it Sooke or Metchosin.

The population of East Sooke is roughly 1,500 (2001 census: 1434). There is no town core, but there is a single convenience store. Typical of the rural nature of the community, not only can one purchase a litre of milk, or a loaf of bread, but one can buy animal feed, or a truck load of gravel from that store. East Sooke is a mix of small residential subdivisions, small hobby farms, and wilderness.

There are currently no schools in East Sooke although there have been plans for an elementary school for a number of years. Some children are bussed to Sooke schools. This community is part of School District 62 Sooke. Many families in East Sooke homeschool their kids negating the need to travel to Sooke for school. This area has a vibrant homeschooling community and there are multiple programs available for families who choose to teach at home.

Neighbourhoods of East Sooke
(in order from east to west)
 Becher Bay
 Seedtree
 Mount Matheson
 Park Heights
 Anderson Cove
 Coppermine
 Seagirt
 Eliza Point
 Tideview

Neighbouring communities
 Sooke
 Metchosin

See also
Mount Matheson

References

External links
East Sooke Community Information Website
Capital Regional District page on East Sooke Park
East Sooke Park
Sooke Events, Societies and Business Information

Unincorporated settlements in British Columbia
Populated places in the Capital Regional District
Greater Victoria
Juan de Fuca region